Chin Gee Hee (June 22, 1844 – 1929), courtesy name Chàngtíng (暢庭), Cheun Gee Yee, was a Chinese merchant, labor contractor, and railway entrepreneur, who made his fortune in Seattle, Washington before returning to his native village in Guangdong province, where he continued his successes.

Life
Born the son of a maker of soy sauce crocks in a village in what is now the city of Taishan, Chin came to the attention of an old man because of his calm after some other boys smashed crocks that he was carrying to market. The man brought him along on his passage to America, where Chin worked in a placer mine before making his way to Port Gamble, Washington, where he worked in a lumber mill.

While still in North Kitsap, he learned a reasonable amount of English, and made friends with several Suquamish, including the family of Chief Seattle. He also met and befriended Henry Yesler, owner of a mill in the young city of Seattle, who convinced him to move there.

In 1873, he arrived in Seattle, a settlement that was about 20 years old at the time. After meeting Chin Chun Hock, who was from the same village in Taishan, he became a junior partner in the Wa Chong company ("Chinese Prosperity"), the city's leading Chinese enterprise of the time. The Wa Chong company imported or manufactured goods including sugar, tea, rice, cigars, opium (legal at the time), and fireworks.

At the time, there were few Chinese women in America. While still in North Kitsap, Chin imported a wife from China. Their son Chin Lem, later known as Tew Dong, born 1875 in Seattle, was the first known Chinese child born in Washington Territory (now Washington State).

At the Wa Chong company, he acquired labor contracts from coal mines, railroads, farming, and the Puget Sound mosquito fleet. As one of the major labor suppliers for Northern Pacific Railway in the Puget Sound district, Chin also helped with payroll and discipline of the Chinese labor. He also placed Chinese house-boys and cooks. His partnership with Chin Ching-hock was somewhat uneasy: Chin Ching-hock was more interested in imports and exports than in the labor contracting that became Chin Gee Hee's specialty.

Chin Gee Hee was a central figure in the efforts at political and diplomatic defense against the anti-Chinese riots of November 1885. During the crisis, he represented the community and exchanged telegrams with Chinese consul general Ow-yang Ming in San Francisco, California. He kept careful records of damages to Chinese businesses, and, partly as a result, Seattle's Chinese community fared far better than that of neighboring Tacoma, ultimately remaining in the city and collecting $700,000 in damages through a favorable ruling by judge Thomas Burke.

In 1888, he set up independently as a labor contractor, with his Quong Tuck Company (also known as Quong Tuck Lung Company) or Quon Tuck Company supplying construction workers to railways (the Great Northern Railway, the Seattle and Walla Walla Railroad and Transportation Company) and to Seattle's regrading projects. He provided work crews (and was involved entrepreneurially) in rail lines along what are now Alaskan Way (along the Seattle waterfront) and a cable car perpendicular to the waterfront along Yesler Way as far as 14th Avenue. 
He also provided Chinese masons to help build the Burke Building, a full city block at Second Avenue and Marion Street.
His own building at Second and Washington, the Canton Building (also known as the Chin Gee Hee Building, now the Kon Yick Building), 208-210 S. Washington Street, was among the first brick buildings raised after the Great Seattle Fire of June 6, 1889. It was shared with the Bow Tai Wo Company. (As of 2007, the building is still standing, though much altered; in particular, a 1928 re-routing of Second Avenue S. removed a corner of the building.)

He passed his Seattle business on to his son, Chin Lem, and son-in-law Woo Quon-bing  and returned in 1904 or 1905 to China, where he was the entrepreneur behind South China's first railway and founded a seaport, while continuing also to have business associations with Seattle. He returned frequently to the U.S. and, in particular, to Seattle, where he retained close ties, and which he last visited in 1922.

His railway was known as the Sun Ning Railway Company. He raised $2.75 million, mainly from overseas Chinese; Chin's partner Yu Zhuo (also variously rendered as Yu Shek) or Yu Chuek raised further funds in China and from overseas Chinese in Southeast Asia. The Sun Ning was the Pearl River Delta's first major railway. Its benefits to Guangdong's economy were cut short when it was seized by local warlords in 1926; it was finally destroyed during the Second Sino-Japanese War in 1938.

While in China, Chin also served as a connection for the Seattle China Club. Members of the China Club, which advocated for increased trade between China and Seattle, were invited to attend the opening of Chin's port in Guangdong.

Notes

References
 Chin Gee Hee, "Letter Asking for Support to Build the Sunning Railroad" (1911), p. 125–128 in Judy Yung, Gordon H. Chang, and Him Mark Lai (compilers and editors), Chinese American Voices, University of California Press (2006). .
 Willard G. Jue, "Chin Gee-hee, Chinese Pioneer Entrepreneur in Seattle and Toishan", The Annals of the Chinese Historical Society of the Pacific Northwest, 1983, 31:38.
 Also, Guide to the Willard G. Jue Papers, 1880-1983 on the site of the University of Washington Libraries, accessed July 19, 2007.
 Douglas C. Sackman, "Pacific World Passages: The Traffic in Trees and the Transformation of Space in Puget Sound, 1850-1900", a paper presented at the American Society for Environmental History Annual Meeting, Victoria, BC, April 3, 2004, especially the section "III. Workers of the Pacific World: Logging and Labor in & around the Mills". Draft available online, accessed July 30, 2007; there is no formally published form as of that date.
 Eric Scigliano, "Seattle's Chinese Founding Father", Seattle Metropolitan, May 2007, p. 48.
 Xiao-huang Yin & Zhiyong Lan, Why Do They Give? Change and Continuity in Chinese American Transnational Philanthropy since the 1970s, commissioned by the Global Equity Initiative for a workshop on Diaspora Philanthropy to China and India, held in May 2003. p. 9. Accessed online 22 September 2007.
 Draft History of the Qing Dynasty, vol. 150.
 The History of Xinning Railway, Bureau of Archives of Taishan City. Undated; the Internet Archive shows the page  December 10, 2004. Accessed online 22 September 2007.
 Page on Seattle’s Chinatown - International District on cwok.com, content attributed to the Wing Luke Museum. Accessed online July 19, 2007.
 Chinese Emigration, the Sunning Railway and the Development of Toisan by Lucie Cheng and Liu Yuzun with Zheng Dehua, Amerasia 9(1): 59-74, 1982.
 Kornel Chang, "American Crossroads: Pacific Connections: The Making of the U.S.-Canadian Borderlands" Berkeley: University of California Press, 2012. .

External links

 David Takami, Chinese Americans HistoryLink.org Essay 2060, February 17, 1999, includes two photos of Chin.

People from Taishan, Guangdong
Chinese emigrants to the United States
Businesspeople from Guangdong
Businesspeople from Seattle
1844 births
American people of Chinese descent
1930 deaths